The Israel Journal of Entomology is a peer-reviewed open access scientific journal covering all areas of entomology, with a worldwide scope. Besides insects, it also covers non-marine Crustacea and Chelicerata. The journal's printed version is produced annually. The journal was established in 1966 and is published by the Entomological Society of Israel. The editor-in-chief is Mike Mostovski (Tel Aviv University and University of KwaZulu-Natal).

Abstracting and indexing
The journal is abstracted and indexed in:
Biological Abstracts
BIOSIS Previews
CAB Abstracts
EBSCO databases
Scopus
The Zoological Record

See also
List of entomology journals

References

External links

Israel Journal of Entomology in ZooBank

Entomology journals and magazines
Publications established in 1966
English-language journals
Creative Commons Attribution-licensed journals
Academic journals published by learned and professional societies
1966 establishments in Israel
Continuous journals